KZPA (900 AM) is a Full Service formatted broadcast radio station licensed to Fort Yukon, Alaska, serving the Yukon Flats.  KZPA is owned and operated by Gwandak Public Broadcasting, Inc.

References

External links
 

1993 establishments in Alaska
Buildings and structures in Yukon–Koyukuk Census Area, Alaska
Fort Yukon, Alaska
Full service radio stations in the United States
Radio stations established in 1993
ZPA